Henry Harris was a Negro league shortstop in the 1920s and 1930s.

Harris made his Negro leagues debut in 1924 with the St. Louis Giants. He went on to play for the Memphis Red Sox, and finished his career in 1932 with the Louisville Black Caps.

References

External links
 and Baseball-Reference Black Baseball stats and Seamheads

Place of birth missing
Place of death missing
Year of birth missing
Year of death missing
Louisville Black Caps players
Memphis Red Sox players
St. Louis Giants (1924) players
Baseball shortstops